Orlovka is a rural locality (a settlement) in Petinskoye Rural Settlement, Khokholsky District, Voronezh Oblast, Russia. The population was 969 as of 2010. There are 7 streets.

Geography 
Orlovka is located on the right bank of the Don River, 27 km northeast of Khokholsky (the district's administrative centre) by road. Petino is the nearest rural locality.

References 

Rural localities in Khokholsky District